The Richmond Football Club are a professional Australian rules football team based in Richmond, Victoria that competes in the Australian Football League (AFL). From its founding in 1885 until 1907 Richmond competed in the Victorian Football Association (VFA). It left the VFA to join the VFL in 1908 and has competed in each season since. Richmond have won 2 VFA/VFL premierships and 13 VFL/AFL premierships.

Table key

AFL/VFL seasons

semAll-time records

Correct as at the end of the 2022 season.

References
General

Specific

External links 
 Richmond Tigers Official AFL Site
 Official Site of the Australian Football League
 Richmond on AFL Tables

Seasons
 
Australian rules football-related lists